James Benedict Hartnett (21 March 1927 – 31 May 1988) was an Irish professional footballer who played in the Football League for Middlesbrough, Hartlepools United and York City as an outside left. He was capped by the Republic of Ireland at international level and represented the League of Ireland XI.

International career 
Hartnett won two caps for the Republic of Ireland national football team and made his debut on 12 June 1949 in a 4–1 friendly defeat to Spain at Dalymount Park. His second and final cap did not come until five years later, when he played in a 1–0 win over Luxembourg in a World Cup qualifying game on 7 March 1954 at the Municipal Stadium, Luxembourg City.

Personal life 
Prior to joining Dundalk, Hartnett worked as an apprentice electrician at Inchicore railway works. After retiring from football, Hartnett worked as an electrician at ICI Wilton and building oil rigs at Seal Sands.

Career statistics

References

Republic of Ireland association footballers
Republic of Ireland international footballers
League of Ireland players
Dundalk F.C. players
Middlesbrough F.C. players
York City F.C. players
Hartlepool United F.C. players
1927 births
English Football League players
1988 deaths
Ireland (FAI) international footballers
Association football outside forwards
Association footballers from Dublin (city)
St Patrick's Athletic F.C. players
Barry Town United F.C. players
King's Lynn F.C. players